Stacey Elaine Travis (born August 29, 1964) is an American actress. She has appeared in films Hardware (1990), The Super (1991), Only the Strong (1993), Traffic (2000), Bandits (2001) and Intolerable Cruelty (2003).

Life and career
Travis was born in Dallas, Texas. Her brother is actor and comedian Greg Travis. She attended the London Academy of Music and Dramatic Art (LAMDA) and graduated from University of Southern California (USC) with a degree in film. She began her career appearing in low-budget comedies and genre films include, Phantasm II, Dr. Hackenstein and Earth Girls Are Easy (1988). From 1989 to 1992, she was regular cast member in the MTV comedy series, Just Say Julie where she played a variety of characters. 

In 1990, Travis played a female leading role in the science fiction horror film  Hardware opposite Dylan McDermott. She next starred in the comedy film The Super (1991) and martial arts film Only the Strong (1993) opposite Mark Dacascos. The following years, Travis played supporting roles in many films, include Mystery Men (1999), Traffic (2000), Ghost World (2001), Bandits (2001), Intolerable Cruelty (2003), Venom (2005), and Easy A (2010). In later years she starred in a direct-to-video sequel to the 1983 film A Christmas Story, A Christmas Story 2 (2012), and the supernatural horror film The Manor (2021).

On television, Travis has made more than 50 appearances. She appeared in a season 7 episode of Seinfeld as Holly, Elaine's cousin and Jerry's current love interest. She had a recurring role in Highlander: The Series as Renee Delaney in the season 2 episodes "Unholy Alliance" Part 1 and Part 2, returning in season 4 in the episode "Double Jeopardy". In 1998, she starred on the short-lived UPN comedy series, Love Boat: The Next Wave as Cruise Director Suzanne Zimmerman. She had a recurring role as Jordana Geist, Lynette’s friend in the Desperate Housewives. Her other guest-starring credits include Picket Fences, Dream On, ER, Diagnosis Murder, Touched by an Angel, Dharma & Greg, The Practice, Frasier, Angel, The Big Bang Theory, Modern Family, Mom and S.W.A.T..

Filmography

Film

Television

References

External links
 

1964 births
Living people
American film actresses
American television actresses
People from Dallas
American expatriates in the United Kingdom
Actresses from Texas
University of Southern California alumni
21st-century American women